Weiherbach may refer to:

Weiherbach (Talbach), a river of Baden-Württemberg, Germany, tributary of the Talbach at Memmingen
Weiherbach (Schmiech), a river of Baden-Württemberg, Germany, tributary of the Schmiech